Fight Club 2 (also known as Fight Club 2: The Tranquility Gambit) is Chuck Palahniuk's comic book meta-sequel to his 1996 novel Fight Club, with art by Cameron Stewart and covers by David Mack.

Premise
Set ten years after the ending of Fight Club, the sequel is told from the restrained perspective of Tyler Durden as he sits in the subconscious of Sebastian (the name the narrator of the original Fight Club currently uses). Sebastian continues his dysfunctional relationship with Marla and has fallen into the mundane routine of society until Tyler re-emerges to cause chaos.

Publication

Palahniuk was convinced to continue Fight Club in comics form by fellow novelist Chelsea Cain and comic writers Brian Michael Bendis, Matt Fraction and Kelly Sue DeConnick. A teaser was released by Dark Horse Comics for Free Comic Book Day 2015, with Fight Club 2 #1 following in late May of that year. The series explores Joseph Campbell's concept of the 'second father' as being vital to the hero's journey, which is something that has always fascinated Palahniuk.

Issues

Collection

Reception
Despite widespread expectation that Fight Club 2 would be able to capitalize on the success of its predecessor, the book was panned by readers upon release. Negative criticism of Fight Club 2 focused on its lack of originality (exemplified by the gratuitous recycling of plot devices from both the source book and subsequent film), confusing narrative, bizarrely metaphysical and ultimately unresolved sub-plots (such as the resurrection of Robert Paulson), and Chuck Palahniuk's breaking of the fourth wall.

Sequel
On the Orbital In Conversation podcast, Palahniuk stated that he was already working on Fight Club 3, which would also be in comic form. He also confirmed that he was working on a series of original short stories for comics which would appear as one-shots before eventually being collected into a single book.

Fight Club 3 consisted of twelve issues. The first issue was released on January 30, 2019.

References

Dark Horse Comics titles
2015 comics debuts
Fight Club
Works by Chuck Palahniuk